Callidula propinqua is a moth in the  family Callidulidae. It is found on Sulawesi.

References

Callidulidae
Moths described in 1877